Jai Devi is an Indian politician and a member of 17th Legislative Assembly, Uttar Pradesh of India. She represents the ‘Malihabad’ constituency in Lucknow district of Uttar Pradesh.

Political career
Jai Devi contested Uttar Pradesh Assembly Election in 2017 as Bhartiya Janata Party candidate and defeated her close contestant Rajbala from Samajwadi Party with a margin of 22,668 votes.

She contested again in 2022 as Bhartiya Janata Party candidate and defeated her close contestant Surendra Kumar from Samajwadi Party with a margin of 7,745 votes.

Posts held

References

Uttar Pradesh MLAs 2017–2022
People from Lucknow district
Living people
1965 births
Uttar Pradesh MLAs 2022–2027
Bharatiya Janata Party politicians from Uttar Pradesh